Mungiki is a banned ethnic organisation in Kenya. The name (mũngĩkĩ) means "a united people" or "multitude" in the Kikuyu language. The religion, which apparently originated in the late 1980s, is secretive and bears some similarity to mystery religions. Specifics of their origin and doctrines are unclear. What is clear is that they favour a return to indigenous African traditions.

They reject Westernisation and all things that they believe to be trappings of colonialism, including Christianity. The ideology of the group is characterised by revolutionary rhetoric, Kikuyu traditions, and a disdain for Kenyan modernisation, which is seen as moral corruption. Mungiki is often referred to as Kenya’s Cosa Nostra, Yakuza, or Kenyan Mafia due to its organizational system. They have been newsworthy for associations with ethnic violence and anti-government resistance.

History
According to one of Mungiki's founders, the group began in the late 1980s as a local militia in the highlands to protect Kikuyu farmers in disputes over land with Maasai and with forces loyal to the government, which was dominated by the Kalenjin tribe at the time. Mungiki arguably has its roots in discontent arising from severe unemployment and landlessness arising from Kenya's rapid population growth, with many disaffected unemployed youth attracted to an organisation giving them a sense of purpose and cultural and political identity, as well as income.

The founders supposedly modelled Mungiki on the Mau Mau fighters who fought British colonial rule. During the 1990s, the group had migrated into Nairobi with the acceptance of the government under Daniel arap Moi and began to dominate the matatu (private minibus taxi) industry. With the move to Nairobi came the development of a cell structure within the group. Each cell contains 50 members and each cell is then divided into 5 platoons.

Using the matatus as a springboard, the group moved into other areas of commerce, such as rubbish collection, construction, and even protection racketeering. Inevitably, the group's actions led to involvement with politicians eager for more support. In 2002, Mungiki backed losing candidates in elections and felt the wrath of the government. The group's activities became less visible although it still received revenue from protection taxes, electricity taxes and water taxes. There have been unconfirmed allegations that Mungiki has links to both the old KANU government and some MPs in the current government. In fact, because of the cult's extreme secrecy, little is known about its membership or hierarchy.

Many members state that at the height of its influence, the group could claim as many as 500,000 members and received substantial sums of money. Many Kenyans debate whether the group's influence in Nairobi is waning or is on the rise.

Extortion and ethnic violence
Mungiki operates most extensively in Mathare, Nairobi's second largest slum, where poverty and crime are pronounced, but it is also in Kayole, Murang'a County and Ruai, Nairobi [waithaka, dagoretti], Kinoo and Westlands. A recent Inter Press Service article vividly describes Mungiki operations in that slum as essentially constituting a "street gang" or a criminal network that contributes to, and feeds off of, an environment plagued by a state of perpetual security crisis.

Every resident of the slum pays a variable sum of money to the organization, in exchange for protection against theft and property damage. In addition, the gang "mans" public toilets, and charges a fee for use of the facilities. Such acts of extortion, along with the general lack of effective local law enforcement, have generally enraged residents of Mathare.

More than 50 people died in 2002 in clashes involving the sect and owners of matatus in Nairobi alone. In 2002 the sect was banned and in February 2003, the sect was in the news following two days of clashes with Nairobi police which left at least two officers dead and 74 sect members in police custody.

In June 2007, the Mungiki embarked upon a murderous campaign to instil fear by beheading matatu drivers, conductors, and Mungiki defectors, and those who refuse their recruitment, drawing an armed response from Kenyan security forces, who stormed the Mathare area. Some 100 people died in the operation.

Mungiki has also been linked to the murder of a family in the United States in which Mrs Jane Kurua, 47, and her two daughters were killed; the case is still under investigation by the FBI. On 12 July 2007 Kenyan authorities reported that Mungiki decapitated and mutilated the body of a two-year-old boy, possibly as part of a ritual.

It is alleged that Mungiki members participated in targeted violence against ethnic Luos around the time of the disputed December 2007 presidential elections.

Police response 
In November 2007, a human-rights group called the Oscar Foundation Free Legal Aid Clinic-Kenya reported that in the five years up to August 2007, Kenyan police had killed over 8,000 people in crackdowns against the Mungiki sect, with further 4,000 people still missing. These allegations were based on interviews, autopsies, and police reports, and were widely circulated both in Kenya  and through an appeal to the International Criminal Court.

Meanwhile, the Kenya National Commission on Human Rights linked the police to the execution of 500 Mungiki over the previous five months. The police described these reports as fictitious. On 5 March 2009, Oscar Foundation Director Oscar Kamau Kingara and Programme Coordinator John Paul Oulo were shot and killed while en route to a meeting at the offices of the Kenya National Commission on Human Rights in Nairobi. Earlier that day, a government spokesman, Alfred Mutua, had publicly accused their organisation of being a fundraising front for Mungiki.

Mungiki chairman Maina Njenga was acquitted on October 27, 2009 as murder charges on him were withdrawn for lack of evidence. About a week later Mungiki spokesman David Gitau Njuguna was shot dead in Nairobi by unknown assailants.

Factional fighting 

In 2007, Mungiki was rumoured to have fractured into two groups. In spite of the peace gestures of Prime Minister Raila Odinga, the dramatic murders of the top Mungiki leaders continued, and police also denied involvement in the assassinations. The Chairman and Treasurer of the Kenya National Youth Alliance (Maina Njenga faction) were gunned down at Uplands after a car chase on the Nairobi – Naivasha highway. The Kenya National Youth Alliance (KNYA) served as Mungiki’s political wing.

According to relatives, Wagacha and Irungu were driving to Naivasha Prison, where Mungiki leader Maina Njenga is serving a jail term, to consult him over possible talks with the government, proposed by Prime Minister Odinga. The relatives said that elements in the government are using the police to ensure negotiations fail, hence the killings. However, police spokesman Eric Kiraithe denied the claims.

At least 500 bodies of suspected Mungiki members have since been discovered in thickets outside Nairobi in the past year. Police say that the recent mysterious deaths of Mungiki leaders were a result of infighting between various Mungiki factions over control of funds and differing political positions. The Mungiki leadership, however, denied the split within their ranks.

Department of Defence and National Intelligence Service involvement 

In early 2003, soon after Mwai Kibaki came into power, the government gave the military leadership three days to explain why ten of their Land Rovers were given to the outlawed Mungiki sect. In the lead up to the General Election, then Chief of the General Staff General Joseph Kibwana was asked to investigate the scandal in person and present his findings to the office of the President. The report was to detail the value of the ten vehicles, who got them, and why they were disposed of.

Military sources at the time said that the orders were issued by National Security minister Chris Murungaru during a meeting with General Kibwana and other top generals at the Department of Defence headquarters in Nairobi. The issue of Land Rovers cropped up when Murungaru made his first familiarisation tour of the DoD, a month after Narc came to power.

Murungaru, who as security minister was responsible for the military, reportedly expressed shock that a cartel of high-ranking officers could have been involved in subversive activities by diverting the Land Rovers to the Mungiki, as detailed in a Daily Nation report on the scandal. Senior DoD officials involved in the cartel were said to have held secret talks shortly before Dr. Murungaru arrived to plan their next course of action. The report and its findings have never been made public.

The Department of Defence has since been converted into the Ministry of Defense, with Mohamed Yusuf Haji as Minister of Defence from 2008 to 2013, then Raychelle Omamo as Cabinet Secretary for Defence from 2013.

The Waki Report
A commission set up to investigate the 2008 post-election violence reported that Mungiki members were suspected of perpetrating the violence. The Waki Report states that a meeting was held in Statehouse to coordinate revenge on Luos and Kalenjins.

The report also recommends that people cited, including minister Uhuru Kenyatta, and Muthaura should face a local judiciary or the International Criminal Court(ICC).

Exile
Many former Mungiki members are believed to have fled the country seeking asylum, as the sect does not allow defection; all initiates have to swear a standard oath ending with the words "May I die if I desert or reveal our secrets."

See also 
 Ethnic conflicts in Kenya
 Crime in Kenya

References

Rebel groups in Kenya
Gangs in Kenya
Anti-Christian sentiment
Anti-Western sentiment